The 1998–99 season was Clydebank's thirty-third season in the Scottish Football League. They competed in the Scottish First Division where they finished 7th. They also competed in the Scottish League Cup and Scottish Cup.

Results

Division 1

Final League table

Scottish League Cup

Scottish Cup

References

Clydebank
Clydebank F.C. (1965) seasons